Lena Schöneborn (born April 11, 1986 in Troisdorf, West Germany) is a German pentathlete, who won the gold medal in the Modern Pentathlon at the 2008 Summer Olympics. She is living in Berlin and besides Pentathlon she is studying Marketing. She won gold at the Women’s Final of the Modern Pentathlon European Championships 2011, held in Medway.

References

External links
 
 

1986 births
Living people
People from Troisdorf
Sportspeople from Cologne (region)
German female modern pentathletes
Olympic modern pentathletes of Germany
Olympic gold medalists for Germany
Modern pentathletes at the 2008 Summer Olympics
Olympic medalists in modern pentathlon
Modern pentathletes at the 2012 Summer Olympics
World Modern Pentathlon Championships medalists
Modern pentathletes at the 2016 Summer Olympics
Medalists at the 2008 Summer Olympics
Recipients of the Silver Laurel Leaf
Recipients of the Order of Merit of Berlin
21st-century German women